Eugenia kameruniana is a species of plant in the family Myrtaceae. It is endemic to Cameroon.  Its natural habitat is subtropical or tropical dry forests. It is threatened by habitat loss.

References

Endemic flora of Cameroon
kameruniana
Critically endangered plants
Taxonomy articles created by Polbot
Plants described in 1899